Charlie Lees (1887-1976) was a rugby league player in the Australian competition - the NSWRFL.

Playing career
Lees played for the Eastern Suburbs club in the years (1911 to 1921). A forward, Lees was a member of Eastern Suburbs' first premiership winning sides in 1911 (in which he scored his side's only try), 1912 and 1913, and won City Cups with the club in 1914, 1915 and 1916.

A solid defensive player, Lees was one of the earliest members to play 100 matches for the Eastern Suburbs club, playing 152 in total. Lees was Eastern Suburbs' sole try scorer in the match that brought the club its first premiership.

Lees was chosen to play for NSW in 1913. He was awarded Life Membership of the New South Wales Rugby League in 1931.

References

The Encyclopedia of Rugby League Players, Alan Whiticker & Glen Hudson
E. E. Christensen's yearbook

Australian rugby league players
Sydney Roosters players
New South Wales rugby league team players
1887 births
1976 deaths
Place of birth missing
Rugby league players from Sydney
Rugby league second-rows
Rugby league props
Rugby league locks